Aglaia densitricha is a species of plant in the family Meliaceae. It is a tree endemic to Peninsular Malaysia.

References

densitricha
Endemic flora of Peninsular Malaysia
Trees of Peninsular Malaysia
Critically endangered plants
Taxonomy articles created by Polbot